Tylopilus is a genus of over 100 species of mycorrhizal bolete fungi separated from Boletus. Its best known member is the bitter bolete (Tylopilus felleus), the only species found in Europe. More species are found in North America, such as the edible species T. alboater. Australia is another continent where many species are found. All members of the genus form mycorrhizal relationships with trees. Members of the genus are distinguished by their pinkish pore surfaces.

Taxonomy
The genus was first defined by Petter Adolf Karsten in 1881. The type species, Tylopilus felleus, was originally described in 1788 as a species of Boletus by French mycologist Pierre Bulliard. Tylopilus means "bumpy or swollen pileus", from the Greek tylos "bump" and pilos "hat".

Molecular analysis indicates the genus, like other large genera within the Boletales, is polyphyletic. A lineage of Tylopilus chromapes (now Harrya chromapes and related species) has been shown to be only distantly related to other members of Tylopilus. Hence T. chromapes is now the type species of the new genus Harrya and, related to it, several Australian species moved to Australopilus. T. valens was also moved to its own genus, Pseudoaustroboletus.

Description
Fruit bodies of the genus Tylopilus are encountered as large stout bolete mushrooms, which generally arise from the ground or occasionally from wood. They have stout stipes, which do not have a ring. A key field character which distinguishes them from members of the genus Boletus is the presence of their pink-tinged pores (though these may be white when young).  The "pink pore" feature is a polyphyletic morphology that does not unite the Tylopilus species using traditional morphological characters (Smith and Thiers or Singer's concepts). The spore print manifests various shades of pinkish-brown, through reddish-brown and even chocolate brown.

Edibility
Many species have a bitter taste and are thus inedible, taste being a key feature in identification of this genus. The black velvet bolete (T. alboater) is a good edible, but is often ignored.

Species
, Index Fungorum lists 111 valid species of Tylopilus. About 40 are found in western North America. A large number have been recorded from Australia, with 26 aligned with existing taxa and another 15 not assignable. Members of the genus are also abundant in South America, particularly in forests with trees of the genus Dicymbe in Guyana, as well as Central America and elsewhere across tropical regions around the world. All are mycorrhizal.

Tylopilus acutesquamosus
Tylopilus albirubens
Tylopilus alboater
Tylopilus albofarinaceus
Tylopilus alkalixanthus
Tylopilus alpinus
Tylopilus alutaceoumbrinus
Tylopilus ammiratii
Tylopilus appalachiensis
Tylopilus arenarius
Tylopilus areolatus
Tylopilus argentatae
Tylopilus argillaceus
Tylopilus ascendens
Tylopilus atratus
Tylopilus atrobrunneus
Tylopilus austrofelleus
Tylopilus atronicotianus
Tylopilus badiceps
Tylopilus beelii
Tylopilus brachypus
Tylopilus brevisporus
Tylopilus brunneirubens
Tylopilus bulbosus
Tylopilus brunneus
Tylopilus callainus
Tylopilus castanoides
Tylopilus cellulosus
Tylopilus cervicolor
Tylopilus cervinicoccineus
Tylopilus chromoreticulatus
Tylopilus conspicuocystidiata
Tylopilus corneri
Tylopilus costaricensis
Tylopilus cremeus
Tylopilus cyanescens
Tylopilus cyanogranulifer
Tylopilus dunensis
Tylopilus exiguus
Tylopilus felleus
Tylopilus ferrugineus
Tylopilus fuligineoviolaceus
Tylopilus fumosipes
Tylopilus funerarius
Tylopilus glutinosus
Tylopilus gomezii
Tylopilus griseocarneus
Tylopilus guanacastensis
Tylopilus hayatae
Tylopilus hondurensis
Tylopilus hongoi
Tylopilus humilis
Tylopilus indecisus
Tylopilus intermedius
Tylopilus isabellescens
Tylopilus jalapensis
Tylopilus javanicus
Tylopilus leucomycelinus
Tylopilus lividobrunneus
Tylopilus louisii
Tylopilus microsporus
Tylopilus minor
Tylopilus mitissimus
Tylopilus montanus
Tylopilus montoyae
Tylopilus nanus
Tylopilus nebulosus
Tylopilus neofelleus
Tylopilus nicaraguensis
Tylopilus niger
Tylopilus nigricans
Tylopilus obscureviolaceus
Tylopilus obscurus
Tylopilus ochraceosquamosus
Tylopilus oradivensis
Tylopilus orsonianus
Tylopilus otsuensis
Tylopilus pachycephalus
Tylopilus pakaraimensis
Tylopilus peralbidus
Tylopilus pernanus
Tylopilus perplexus
Tylopilus piniphilus
Tylopilus pisciodorus
Tylopilus plumbeoviolaceoides
Tylopilus plumbeoviolaceus
Tylopilus porphyrosporus
Tylopilus potamogeton
Tylopilus praeanisatus
Tylopilus pseudoscaber
Tylopilus punctatofumosus
Tylopilus rhoadsiae
Tylopilus rhodoconius
Tylopilus rigens
Tylopilus rubrobrunneus
Tylopilus rufonigricans
Tylopilus rugulosoreticulatus
Tylopilus sanctae-rosae
Tylopilus snellii
Tylopilus sordidus
Tylopilus striatulus
Tylopilus subcellulosus
Tylopilus subfusipes
Tylopilus subniger
Tylopilus subunicolor
Tylopilus subvinaceipallidus
Tylopilus sultanii
Tylopilus suavissimus
Tylopilus subcellulosus
Tylopilus tabacinus
Tylopilus temucensis
Tylopilus tenuis
Tylopilus variobrunneus
Tylopilus veluticeps
Tylopilus vinaceipallidus
Tylopilus vinaceogriseus
Tylopilus vinosobrunneus
Tylopilus violaceus
Tylopilus violatinctus
Tylopilus virescens
Tylopilus viscidichromapes
Tylopilus williamsii
Tylopilus zambianus

References

External links

 Mushroom Expert - The Genus Tylopilus

 
Boletales genera
Taxa named by Petter Adolf Karsten